FREDA is a mnemonic used in aviation, particularly light aircraft.

It stands for:

 Fuel - is there sufficient fuel and is the correct tank selected? Does the tank need to be changed or the fuel balanced?
 Radios - is the correct frequency set?
 Engine - are the temperatures and pressures OK?
 Direction Indicator - is it aligned with the compass?
 Altitude - is the altitude correct and is the correct pressure set on the altimeter?

See also
List of aviation mnemonics

References

Aviation mnemonics